Docteur Françoise Gailland is a 1976 French film directed by Jean-Louis Bertuccelli, and starring Annie Girardot, Jean-Pierre Cassel, François Périer and Isabelle Huppert. It won the César Award for Best Actress, and was nominated for Best Cinematography.

Plot 
Dr. Françoise Gailland has a hectic schedule, which causes her to have little time to spend with her family, which consists of her husband Gérard, her pregnant teenaged daughter Elisabeth, and her sullen son Julien. However, she does manage to find the time to spend with her lover, Daniel Letessier. While her life in such disarray, she learns that she has cancer. Françoise tries to put a brave face on it, and is determined to face the life-threatening disease with courage.

Cast 
 Annie Girardot as Françoise Gailland
 Jean-Pierre Cassel as Daniel Letessier
 François Périer as Gérard Gailland
 Isabelle Huppert as Élisabeth Gailland
 William Coryn as Julien Gailland
 Suzanne Flon as Geneviève Liénard
 Anouk Ferjac as Fabienne Cristelle
 Michel Subor as Régis Cabret
 Josephine Chaplin as Hélène Varèse
 André Falcon as Jean Rimevale
 Jacqueline Doyen as Raymonde
 Margo Lion as Mammy - la mère de Françoise
 Jacques Richard as Le docteur Lesoux
 Andrée Damant

See also
 Isabelle Huppert on screen and stage

References

External links 

1976 films
1970s French-language films
1976 drama films
Films featuring a Best Actress César Award-winning performance
Films directed by Jean-Louis Bertuccelli
French drama films
1970s French films